Cumulonimbus calvus is a moderately tall cumulonimbus cloud that is capable of precipitation but has not yet reached the tropopause, which is the height of stratospheric stability at which cumulonimbus forms into cumulonimbus capillatus (fibrous-top) or cumulonimbus incus (anvil-top). Cumulonimbus calvus develops from cumulus congestus, and its further development, under auspicious conditions, will result in cumulonimbus incus.

This cloud consists mainly of water droplets. By definition of cumulonimbus cloud, at its top water droplets are transformed into ice crystals. But for cumulonimbus calvus, content of ice crystals are meager and polar are in early stage, so cloud tops still look round and puffy.

Cumulonimbus calvus is characterized by distinctive (between other types of cumulonimbus cloud) rounded shape and relatively sharp edges of its top area, unlike cumulonimbus incus or cumulonimbus capillatus, which have cirriform tops. Developing cumulonimbus calvus lose sharp outlines of the top as more water droplets transform into ice crystals. Strong updrafts may form pileus or thin vertical stripes may protrude upwards out of the cloud. When upper parts of the cloud freeze to a greater extent and clearly visible cirriforms appear, cumulonimbus calvus metamorphoses into another species of cumulonimbus.

Cumulonimbus calvus arcus is a sub-form of cumulonimbus calvus, which has arcus cloud ahead of cloud's front.

Hazards
Like other cumulonimbus clouds, cumulonimbus calvus can cause severe weather conditions including: 
Lightning; these clouds produce lightning.
Wind; these clouds may produce strong winds especially during a downburst
Hail; these clouds can sometimes produce hail

The cumulonimbus calvus can further grow larger if the updraft is strong. It can form into a cumulonimbus incus, and bring more severe thunderstorms that can cause constant cloud-to-ground lightning, extensive wind damage, microbursts, hail, and occasionally a tornado.

Cumulus